Farah Pahlavi (née Farah Diba; born 14 October 1938) is the widow of the last Shah of Iran, Mohammad Reza Pahlavi, and was successively Queen and Empress (Shahbanu) of Iran from 1959 to 1979. She was born into a prosperous family whose fortunes were diminished after her father's early death. While studying architecture in Paris, France, she was introduced to the Shah at the Iranian embassy, and they were married in December 1959. The Shah's first two marriages had not produced a son—necessary for royal succession—resulting in great rejoicing at the birth of Crown Prince Reza in October of the following year. Diba was then free to pursue interests other than domestic duties, though she was not allowed a political role. She worked for many charities, and founded Iran's first American-style university, enabling more women to become students in the country. She also facilitated the buying-back of Iranian antiquities from museums abroad.

By 1978, growing anti-imperial unrest fueled by communism, socialism, and Islamism throughout Iran was showing clear signs of impending revolution, prompting the Shahbanu and the Shah to leave the country in January 1979 under the threat of a death sentence. For this reason, most countries were reluctant to harbour them, with Anwar Sadat's Egypt being an exception. Facing execution should he return, and in ill health, the Shah died in exile in July 1980. In widowhood, Diba has continued her charity work, dividing her time between Washington, D.C. in the United States and Paris, France.

Childhood

Farah Diba was born on 14 October 1938 in Tehran to an upper-class family. She was the only child of Captain Sohrab Diba (1899–1948) and his wife, Farideh Ghotbi (1920–2000). In her memoir, the Shahbanu writes that her father's family were natives of Iranian Azerbaijan while her mother's family were of Gilak origin, from Lahijan on the Iranian coast of the Caspian Sea.

Through her father, Farah came from a relatively affluent background. In the late 19th century her grandfather had been a diplomat serving as the Persian Ambassador to the Romanov Court in St. Petersburg, Russia. Her own father was an officer in the Imperial Iranian Armed Forces and a graduate of the French Military Academy at St. Cyr.

Farah wrote in her memoir that she had a close bond with her father, and his unexpected death in 1948 deeply affected her. The young family was in a difficult financial state. In these reduced circumstances, they were forced to move from their large family villa in northern Tehran into a shared apartment with one of Farideh Ghotbi's brothers.

Education and engagement
 
The young Farah Diba began her education at Tehran's Italian School, then moved to the French Jeanne d’Arc School until the age of sixteen and later to the Lycée Razi. She was an athlete in her youth, becoming captain of her school's basketball team. Upon finishing her studies at the Lycée Razi, she pursued an interest in architecture at the École Spéciale d'Architecture in Paris, where she was a student of Albert Besson.

Many Iranian students who were studying abroad at this time were dependent on State sponsorship. Therefore, when the Shah, as head of state, made official visits to foreign countries, he frequently met with a selection of local Iranian students. It was during such a meeting in 1959 at the Iranian Embassy in Paris that Farah Diba was first presented to Mohammed Reza Pahlavi.

After returning to Tehran in the summer of 1959, the Shah and Farah Diba began a carefully choreographed courtship, orchestrated in part by the Shah's daughter Princess Shahnaz. The couple announced their engagement on 23 November 1959.

Marriage and family

Farah Diba married Shah Mohammed Reza on 20 December 1959, aged 21. The young Queen of Iran (as she was styled at the time) was the object of much curiosity and her wedding received worldwide press attention. Her gown was designed by Yves Saint Laurent, then a designer at the house of Dior, and she wore the newly commissioned Noor-ol-Ain Diamond tiara.

After the pomp and celebrations associated with the imperial wedding, the success of this union became contingent upon the queen's ability to produce a male heir. Although he had been married twice before, the Shah's previous marriages had given him only a daughter who, under agnatic primogeniture, could not inherit the throne. The pressure for the young queen was acute. The shah himself was deeply anxious to have a male heir as were the members of his government. Furthermore, it was known that the dissolution of the Shah's previous marriage to Queen Soraya had been due to her infertility.

The couple had four children:

 Crown Prince Reza Pahlavi of Iran (born 31 October 1960)
 Princess Farahnaz Pahlavi of Iran (born 12 March 1963)
 Prince Ali Reza Pahlavi of Iran (28 April 1966 – 4 January 2011)
 Princess Leila Pahlavi of Iran (27 March 1970 – 10 June 2001)

As queen and empress

The exact role the new queen would play, if any, in public or government affairs, was uncertain with her main role being simply to give the Shah a male heir. Within the Imperial Household, her public function was secondary to the far more pressing matter of assuring the succession. However, after the birth of the Crown Prince, the Queen was free to devote more of her time to other activities and official pursuits. Mohammad Reza was always attracted to tall women and Farah was taller than her husband, which led him to wear elevator shoes to disguise this fact. Usually when the Imperial couple were photographed, one or both would be sitting in a chair or alternatively the Shah and his wife were photographed on a staircase with Mohammad Reza standing on the upper stairs.

Like many other royal consorts, the Queen initially limited herself to a ceremonial role. In 1961 during a visit to France, the Francophile Farah befriended the French culture minister André Malraux, leading her to arrange the exchange of cultural artifacts between French and Iranian art galleries and museums, a lively trade that continued until the Islamic revolution of 1979. She spent much of her time attending the openings of various education and health-care institutions without venturing too deeply into controversial issues. However, as time progressed, this position changed. The Queen became much more actively involved in government affairs where it concerned issues and causes that interested her. She used her proximity and influence with her husband, the Shah, to secure funding and focus attention on causes, particularly in the areas of women's rights and cultural development. Farah's concerns were the "realms of education, health, culture and social matters" with politics being excluded from her purview. However, Mohammad Reza's politically powerful twin sister Princess Ashraf came to see Farah as a rival. It was the rivalry with Princess Ashraf that led Farah to press her husband into reducing her influence at the Court.

One of the Empress's main initiatives was founding Pahlavi University, which was meant to improve the education of Iranian women, and was the first American style university in Iran; before then, Iranian universities had always been modeled on the French style. The Empress wrote in 1978 that her duties were:

I could not write in detail of all the organizations over which I preside and in which I take a very active part, in the realms of education, health, culture and social matters. It would need a further book. A simple list would perhaps give some idea: the Organization for Family Well Being-nurseries for the children of working mothers, teaching women and girls to read, professional training, family planning; the Organization for Blood Transfusion; the Organization for the Fight Against Cancer; the Organization for Help to the Needy, the Health Organization ... the Children's Centre; the Centre for the Intellectual Development of Children ... the Imperial Institute of Philosophy; the Foundation for Iranian Culture; the Festival of Shiraz, the Tehran Cinema Festival; the Iranian Folklore Organization; the Asiatic Institute; the Civilisations Discussion Centre; the Pahlavi University; the Academy of Sciences.

Farah worked long hours at her charitable activities, from about 9 am to 9 pm every weekday. Eventually, the Queen came to preside over a staff of 40 who handled various requests for assistance on a range of issues. She became one of the most highly visible figures in the Imperial Government and the patron of 24 educational, health and cultural organizations. Her humanitarian role earned her immense popularity for a time, particularly in the early 1970s. During this period, she travelled a great deal within Iran, visiting some of the more remote parts of the country and meeting with the local citizens.
Her significance was exemplified by her part in the 1967 Coronation Ceremonies, where she was crowned as the first shahbanu (empress) of modern Iran. It was again confirmed when the Shah named her as the official regent should he die or be incapacitated before the Crown Prince's 21st birthday. The naming of a woman as regent was highly unusual for a Middle Eastern or Muslim monarchy. The great wealth generated by Iran's oil encouraged a sense of Iranian nationalism at the Imperial Court. The Empress recalled of her days as a university student in 1950s France about being asked where she was from:

When I told them Iran ... the Europeans would recoil in horror as if Iranians were barbarians and loathsome. But after Iran became wealthy under the Shah in the 1970s, Iranians were courted everywhere. Yes, Your Majesty. Of course, Your Majesty. If you please, Your Majesty. Fawning all over us. Greedy sycophants. Then they loved Iranians.

Contributions to art and culture

From the beginning of her reign, the Empress took an active interest in promoting culture and the arts in Iran. Through her patronage, numerous organizations were created and fostered to further her ambition of bringing historical and contemporary Iranian Art to prominence both inside Iran and in the Western world.

In addition to her own efforts, the Empress sought to achieve this goal with the assistance of various foundations and advisers. Her ministry encouraged many forms of artistic expression, including traditional Iranian arts (such as weaving, singing, and poetry recital) as well as Western theatre. Her most recognized endeavour supporting the performing arts was her patronage of the Shiraz Arts Festival. This occasionally controversial event was held annually from 1967 until 1977 and featured live performances by both Iranian and Western artists.

The majority of her time, however, went into the creation of museums and the building of their collections.

As a former architecture student, the Empress's appreciation of it is demonstrated in the Royal Palace of Niavaran, designed by Mohsen Foroughi, and completed in 1968: it mixes traditional Iranian architecture with 1960's contemporary design. Nearby is the personal library of the Empress, consisting of 22,000 books, comprising principally works on Western and Eastern art, philosophy and religion; the interior was designed by Aziz Farmanfarmayan.

Ancient art
Historically a culturally rich country, the Iran of the 1960s had little to show for it. Many of the great artistic treasures produced during its 2,500-year history had found their way into the hands of foreign museums and private collections. It became one of the Empress's principal goals to procure for Iran an appropriate collection of its own historic artifacts. To that end, she secured from her husband's government permission and funds to "buy back" a wide selection of Iranian artifacts from foreign and domestic collections. This was achieved with the help of the brothers Houshang and Mehdi Mahboubian, the most prominent Iranian antiquities dealers of the era, who advised the Empress from 1972 to 1978. With these artifacts she founded several national museums (many of which still survive to this day) and began an Iranian version of the National Trust.

Museums and cultural centres created under her guidance include the Negarestan Cultural Center, the Reza Abbasi Museum, the Khorramabad Museum with its valuable collection of Lorestān bronzes, the National Carpet Gallery and the Glassware and Ceramic Museum of Iran.

Contemporary art

Aside from building a collection of historic Iranian artifacts, the Empress also expressed interest in acquiring contemporary Western and Iranian art. To this end, she put her significant patronage behind the Tehran Museum of Contemporary Art. The fruits of her work in founding and expanding that institution are perhaps the Empress' most enduring cultural legacy to the people of Iran.

Using funds allocated from the government, the Empress took advantage of a somewhat depressed art market of the 1970s to purchase several important works of Western art. Under her guidance, the museum acquired nearly 150 works by such artists as Pablo Picasso, Claude Monet, George Grosz, Andy Warhol, Jackson Pollock, and Roy Lichtenstein. Today, the collection of the Tehran Museum of Contemporary Art is widely considered to be one of the most significant outside Europe and the United States. The vast collection has been tastefully showcased within a large coffee table book published by Assouline titled Iran Modern
According to Parviz Tanavoli, a modern Iranian sculptor and a former Cultural Adviser to the Empress, that the impressive collection was amassed for "tens, not hundreds, of millions of dollars". Today, the value of these holdings are conservatively estimated to be near US$2.8 billion.

The collection created a conundrum for the anti-western Islamic Republic which took power after the fall of the Pahlavi Dynasty in 1979. Although politically the fundamentalist government rejected Western influence in Iran, the Western art collection amassed by the Empress was retained, most likely due to its enormous value. It was, nevertheless, not publicly displayed and spent nearly two decades in storage in the vaults of the Tehran Museum of Contemporary Art. This caused much speculation as to the fate of the artwork which was only put to rest after a large portion of the collection was briefly seen again in an exhibition that took place in Tehran during September 2005.

Islamic Revolution

In Iran by early 1978, a number of factors contributed to the internal dissatisfaction with the Imperial Government becoming more pronounced.

Discontent within the country continued to escalate and later in the year led to demonstrations against the monarchy. Pahlavi wrote in her memoirs that during this time "there was an increasingly palpable sense of unease". Under these circumstances most of the Shahbanu's official activities were cancelled due to concerns for her safety.

As the year came to a close, the political situation deteriorated further. Riots and unrest grew more frequent, culminating in January 1979. The government enacted martial law in most major Iranian cities and the country was on the verge of an open revolution.

It was at this time, in response to the violent protests, that Mohammad Reza and Farah decided to leave the country. They both departed Iran via aircraft on 16 January 1979.

After leaving Iran
The question of where the Shah and Shahbanu would go after leaving Iran was the subject of some debate, even between the monarch and his advisers. During his reign, Mohammad Reza had maintained close relations with Egyptian President Anwar Sadat and Farah had developed a close friendship with the President's wife, Jehan Sadat. The Egyptian President extended an invitation to the Imperial Couple for asylum in Egypt which they accepted.

Due to the political situation unfolding in Iran, many governments, including those which had been on friendly terms with the Iranian Monarchy prior to the revolution, saw the Shah's presence within their borders as a liability. The Revolutionary Government in Iran had ordered the arrest (and later death) of both the Shah and the Shahbanu. The new Iranian Government would go on to vehemently demand their extradition a number of times but the extent to which it would act in pressuring foreign powers for the deposed monarch's return (and presumably that of the Empress) was at that time unknown.

The Imperial couple were aware of the potential danger which their presence posed to their hosts. In response, they left Egypt, beginning a fourteen-month long search for permanent asylum and a journey which took them through many countries. After Egypt, they traveled to Morocco, where they were briefly the guests of King Hassan II.

After leaving Morocco, the Shah and Empress were granted temporary refuge in the Bahamas. After their Bahamian visas expired and were not renewed, they made an appeal to Mexico, which was granted, and rented a villa in Cuernavaca near Mexico City.

Shah's illness

After leaving Egypt, the Shah's health began a rapid decline due to a long-term battle with non-Hodgkin's lymphoma. The seriousness of that illness brought the now exiled Imperial couple briefly to the United States in search of medical treatment. The couple's presence in the United States further inflamed the already tense relations between Washington and the revolutionaries in Tehran. The Shah's stay in the US, although for medical purposes, became the tipping point for renewed hostilities between the two nations. These events ultimately led to the attack and takeover of the American Embassy in Tehran in what became known as the Iran hostage crisis.

Under these difficult circumstances, the Shah and Empress were not given permission to remain in the United States. Shortly after receiving basic medical attention, the couple again departed for Latin America, although this time the destination was Contadora Island in Panama.

By now, both the Shah and the Empress viewed the Carter administration with some antipathy in response to a lack of support and were initially pleased to leave. That attitude, however soured as speculation arose that the Panamanian government was seeking to arrest the Shah in preparation for extradition to Iran. Under these conditions, the Shah and Empress again made an appeal to President Anwar Sadat to return to Egypt (for her part Empress Farah writes that this plea was made through a conversation between herself and Jehan Sadat). Their request was granted and they returned to Egypt in March 1980, where they remained until the Shah's death four months later on 27 July 1980.

Life in exile

After the Shah's death, the exiled Shahbanu remained in Egypt for nearly two years. She was the regent in pretence from 27 July to 31 October 1980. President Anwar Sadat gave her and her family use of Koubbeh Palace in Cairo. A few months after President Sadat's assassination in October 1981, the Shahbanu and her family left Egypt. President Ronald Reagan informed her that she was welcome in the United States.

She first settled in Williamstown, Massachusetts, but later bought a home in Greenwich, Connecticut. After the death of her daughter Princess Leila in 2001, she purchased a smaller home in Potomac, Maryland, near Washington, D.C., to be closer to her son and grandchildren. Farah now divides her time between Washington, D.C., and Paris. She also makes an annual July visit to the late Shah's mausoleum at Cairo's al-Rifa'i Mosque.

Farah attended the 11 June 2004 funeral of President Ronald Reagan, the 40th President of the United States, in Washington, D.C.

Farah supports charities, including the Annual Alzheimer Gala IFRAD (International Fund Raising for Alzheimer Disease) held in Paris.

Farah Pahlavi continues to appear at certain international royal events, such as the 2004 wedding of Crown Prince Frederik of Denmark, the 2010 wedding of Prince Nikolaos of Greece and Denmark, the 2011 wedding of Albert II, Prince of Monaco and the 2016 wedding of Crown Prince Leka II of Albania.

Grandchildren
Farah Pahlavi currently has three grandchildren (granddaughters) through her son Reza Pahlavi, Crown Prince of Iran and his wife Yasmine.

 Princess Noor Pahlavi (born 3 April 1992)
 Princess Iman Pahlavi (born 12 September 1993)
 Princess Farah Pahlavi (born 17 January 2004)

Farah Pahlavi also has one granddaughter through her late son Ali Reza Pahlavi and his companion Raha Didevar.

 Iryana Leila Pahlavi (born 26 July 2011)

Memoir
In 2003, Farah Pahlavi wrote a book about her marriage to Mohammad Reza entitled An Enduring Love: My Life with the Shah. The publication of the former Empress's memoirs attracted international interest. It was a best-seller in Europe, with excerpts appearing in news magazines and the author appearing on talk shows and in other media outlets. However, opinion about the book, which Publishers Weekly called "a candid, straightforward account" and The Washington Post called "engrossing", was mixed.

Elaine Sciolino, The New York Times Paris bureau chief, gave the book a less than flattering review, describing it as "well translated" but "full of anger and bitterness". But National Review's Reza Bayegan, an Iranian writer, praised the memoir as "abound[ing] with affection and sympathy for her countrymen."

Documentaries and theatre play
In 2009 the Persian-Swedish director Nahid Persson Sarvestani released a feature length documentary about Farah Pahlavi's life, entitled The Queen and I. The film was screened in various International film festivals such as IDFA and Sundance. In 2012 the Dutch director Kees Roorda made a theatre play inspired by the life of Farah Pahlavi in exile. In the play Liz Snoijink acted as Farah Diba.

Honours

National
  Order of the Pleiades, 1st Class

Foreign
 : Grand Star of the Decoration of Honour for Services to the Republic of Austria
 : Grand Cross of the Order of the White Lion
: Knight Grand Cross with Collar of the Order of Merit of the Italian Republic
 : Dame Grand Cross of the Order of Isabella the Catholic
 : Dame Grand Cordon with Chain of the Order of the Royal House of Chakri

Awards

 : Look! Women of the Year Hope Award
 : Foreign Associate Academician of the Académie des Beaux-Arts
 : Steiger Award
 : Südwestfalen Charlie Award
 : National Museum of Women in the Arts Award for International Cultural Patronage

See also

Empress Crown

References

Bibliography
 An Enduring Love: My Life with the Shah.

External links

 

|-

|-

|-

|-

20th-century Iranian women
21st-century Iranian women
1938 births
Living people
Wives of Mohammad Reza Pahlavi
People of the Iranian Revolution
Recipients of the Grand Star of the Decoration for Services to the Republic of Austria
Grand Crosses of the Order of the White Lion
Knights Grand Cross of the Order of Merit of the Italian Republic
Dames Grand Cross of the Order of Isabella the Catholic
Iranian Azerbaijanis
Muslim reformers
Iranian empresses
People from Tehran
Iranian artists
Iranian architects
Iranian women architects
Iranian women artists
Iranian emigrants to France
Iranian emigrants to the United States
Exiles of the Iranian Revolution in the United States
Exiles of the Iranian Revolution in Egypt
Exiles of the Iranian Revolution in Morocco
Exiles of the Iranian Revolution in the Bahamas
Exiles of the Iranian Revolution in Mexico
Exiles of the Iranian Revolution in Panama
People from Potomac, Maryland
École Spéciale d'Architecture alumni
Iranian memoirists
Iranian queens